Lucius of Alexandria was an Arian who was twice installed as Patriarch of Alexandria, first in 363, during the reign of Athanasius, and the second between 373 and 380, competing with Peter II of Alexandria.

References

4th-century Popes and Patriarchs of Alexandria
Arian bishops